An extended period of tornado activity that occurred between April 20-27, 2007. The outbreak sequence is best known for producing a deadly pair of tornadoes that struck the border cities of Piedras Negras, Coahuila (rated F4), and Eagle Pass, Texas (rated EF3), along the United States-Mexican border on April 24, 2007 killing ten people. Other strong tornadoes also caused damage and injuries in or near the towns of Moorefield, Nebraska, Gothenburg, Nebraska, Cactus, Texas, and Tulia, Texas. In all, 93 tornadoes were confirmed causing 10 fatalities and injuring at least 37 others.

Meteorological synopsis
Activity was not widespread on April 20, but two strong tornadoes were confirmed in southwestern Nebraska from a single supercell that suddenly developed. The first was an EF3 tornado near Moorefield, Nebraska, which destroyed six farmsteads and injured two people. A large wedge EF2 tornado touched down near Gothenburg and injured nine people as it crossed over Interstate 80, before moving north through rural areas, damaging several farms.

On April 20, the SPC issued a moderate risk of severe thunderstorms for the Texas and Oklahoma Panhandles and the southwestern part of Kansas for April 21, which was extended into Nebraska later. Widespread severe weather developed that evening, although the primary result of the supercells was large hail. The meteorological synopsis was virtually identical to March 28 except for the fact that the air mass was not as unstable. In total, 24 tornadoes were confirmed Despite this, five EF2 tornadoes were confirmed in the Texas Panhandle that day. A large high-end EF2 tornado struck Cactus, Texas damaging or destroying numerous structures and injuring 14 people. Another high-end EF2 tornado struck community was Tulia, Texas where more structures were heavily damaged or destroyed and three people were injured. Over 100 reports of hail were recorded on this day as well. Only isolated severe weather activity occurred on April 22 with only one tornado being confirmed.

A severe weather outbreak was forecast for April 23 and 24 across the southern Plains. In the early morning hours of April 22, the SPC issued a moderate risk of severe weather for South Central Kansas, Central Oklahoma, and North Central Texas. This was an extremely rare issuance; at the time, this was only the third time that such a risk been issued so far in advance with the others being for June 10, 2005 and January 2, 2006, although neither time did it result in a major outbreak. Several tornadic storms were reported across northwest and south-central Texas, far western Oklahoma, and southwest Kansas on April 23. A total of 29 tornadoes were confirmed, although most stayed over sparsely populated area. The activity quickly redeveloped late on the morning of April 24. Later in the afternoon, the risk that day was upgraded to a high risk over parts of East Texas. Tornadoes, along with large hail and damaging winds, occurred in the afternoon and evening hours across the Plains. Although there was virtually no activity in the high risk area, several tornadoes occurred elsewhere. One large tornadic supercell produced a deadly F4 tornado in Piedras Negras, Coahuila in Mexico killing seven people, the same supercell moved into Eagle Pass, Texas, with reports of significant damage on the U.S. side of the border and at least seven deaths and 74 injuries from the EF3 tornado, plus at least three deaths and at least 40 injuries across the river in Piedras Negras. Isolated tornadic activity occurred on April 25, but a non-tornadic fatality occurred in Lake Village, Arkansas when  winds capsized a boat on Lake Chicot.

Several tornadoes developed across the Midwest and into the Tennessee Valley on the afternoon and evening of April 26. The hardest hit communities were LaPorte, Indiana, which was struck by two EF1 tornadoes, and New Tazewell, Tennessee, which was also hit by an EF1 tornado, where structural damage was reported in both communities, and dozens of houses were damaged or destroyed. Several other scattered tornadoes were reported, along with widespread wind damage. In total, seven people were injured. Four other tornadoes were confirmed in Ohio and Illinois. In the final review of 2007, three EF0 tornadoes were confirmed on April 27. Two of which were in Missouri and the other touched down in Virginia.

Confirmed tornadoes

Note: The EF4 tornado was actually rated F4, because Mexico used the Fujita scale.

April 20 event

April 21 event

April 22 event

April 23 event

April 24 event

April 25 event

April 26 event

April 27 event

See also
 Tornadoes of 2007
 List of North American tornadoes and tornado outbreaks

Notes

References

External links 

 Storm Prediction Center
 Summary of the Olton - Tulia tornado
 NWS Austin/San Antonio Summary of the Eagle Pass tornado
 Border storms' death toll rises to 10, USA Today, April 25, 2007
 NWS Fort Worth Tornado Storm Survey
Note: The tornado listed under "EF4" was actually an "F4".

Tornadoes in Texas
Tornadoes in Nebraska
Tornadoes of 2007
F4 tornadoes by date
F3 tornadoes by date
Maverick County, Texas
Natural history of Coahuila
2007 in Mexico
2007 natural disasters in the United States
Tornado outbreak sequence